Živanović (Cyrillic script: Живановић) is a Serbian patronymic surname derived from a masculine given name Živan. It may refer to:

Bojan Živanović (born 1989), footballer
Boris Živanović (born 1989), footballer
Darko Živanović (born 1987), long-distance runner
Ivan Živanović (footballer, born 1981), footballer
Ivan Živanović (footballer, born 1995), footballer
Milivoje Živanović (1900–1979), actor
Miloš Živanović (born 1988), footballer
Mihailo Živanović (1928–1989), musician
Nenad Živanović (born 1980), footballer
Stefan Živanović (born 1989), basketball player
Todor Živanović (1927–1978), footballer

Serbian surnames
Patronymic surnames
Surnames from given names